Bergl is a surname. Notable people with the surname include:

Emily Bergl (born 1975), English-American actress
Joe Bergl (1901–1950), American car mechanic
Maurice Bergl (1917–2009), English table tennis player

See also
Bergel
Bergling